The canton of Laon-Nord is a former administrative division in northern France. It was disbanded following the French canton reorganisation which came into effect in March 2015. It had 16,554 inhabitants (2012).

The canton comprised the following communes:

Aulnois-sous-Laon
Besny-et-Loizy
Bucy-lès-Cerny
Cerny-lès-Bucy
Chambry
Crépy
Laon (partly)
Molinchart
Vivaise

Demographics

See also
Cantons of the Aisne department

References

Former cantons of Aisne
2015 disestablishments in France
States and territories disestablished in 2015